The William P. Hobby Unit (HB) is a prison for women in unincorporated Falls County, Texas, United States. Named after William P. Hobby, Lieutenant Governor of Texas, it is a part of the Texas Department of Criminal Justice (TDCJ).

The unit has a capacity of 1,342.

History
The prison was established in November 1989.

In 2005 prisoner Helen Ann Caples filed a federal lawsuit, accusing the prison of using contaminated water from the City of Marlin. The federal authorities rejected the lawsuit.

As of 2008 the prison had 1,293 inmates.

In September 2014 a sewage backup occurred at the unit, affecting drinking water and toilet services.

As of October 2014 the same warden oversees both the Hobby and Marlin Units. That month Vikki Wright, the warden of Hobby, stated that the unit was not fully staffed but that it was still functional.

Notable prisoners
Current:
 Kristi Koslow, conspirator in the murder of Caren Koslow/
 Marcia Kelly
 Diane Zamora

Former Inmates
Former:
 Susan Wright

References

External links
 William P. Hobby Unit

Women's prisons in Texas
1989 establishments in Texas
Buildings and structures in Falls County, Texas